Limnellia is a genus of shore flies in the family Ephydridae.

Species

L. anderssoni Mathis, 1978
L. anna Cresson, 1935
L. balioptera Mathis, 1978
L. fallax (Czerny, 1903) c g
L. flavifrontis Costa, Savaris, Marinoni & Mathis, 2016
L. flavitarsis Zhang & Yang, 2009 g
L. helmuti Hollmann-Schirrmacher & Zatwarnicki, 1995 c g
L. huachuca Mathis, 1978
L. itatiaia Mathis, 1980
L. lactea Mathis, 1978
L. lecocercus Mathis, 1978
L. luchunensis Zhang & Yang, 2009
L. maculipennis Malloch, 1925
L. minima Canzoneri & Meneghini, 1969
L. picta Canzoneri & Meneghini, 1969
L. quadrata (Fallén, 1813)
L. rainier Mathis and Zack, 1980 i c g
L. sejuncta (Loew, 1863) i c g
L. stenhammari (Zetterstedt, 1846) i c g
L. sticta Mathis, 1978
L. surturi Andersson, 1971
L. turneri Mathis, 1978
L. vounitis Costa, Savaris, Marinoni & Mathis, 2016

Data sources: i = ITIS, c = Catalogue of Life, g = GBIF, b = Bugguide.net

References

Further reading

External links

 

Ephydridae
Brachycera genera
Diptera of North America
Diptera of Europe
Diptera of Asia
Diptera of Africa
Diptera of Australasia
Taxa named by John Russell Malloch